Ladana (Devnagari : लदाना) was an thikana estate of Naruka Rajputs, which lie in present-day Phagi Tehsil of Jaipur District, India. Bharat Singh Naruka, who defeated Amir Khan Pindari belonged to this thikana.

Connections 
Raja Udaikaran (1367), the 3rd king of Amber, had his second eldest son Rao Nar Singh among others. Rao Bar Singh who is said to be the eldest son, gave up his right of succession in favour of his brother Nar Singh. Bar Singh received the estates of Jhag and Mauzamabad towns, a few miles south-west of Jaipur. His grandson was Rao Naru Singh, the eponymous founder of Naruka clan.

Thakur Kesri Singh, Thakur of Ladana, eighth in descent from Rao Dasaji (eldest son of Rao Naru), was made the Jagirdar of Ladana by the then ruler of Jaipur. He married and had issue, two sons. Thakur Sawant Singh, succeeded his father and became head of the Ladana Thikana. Thakur Nahar Singh was granted the estate of Lawa by the ruler of Jaipur in the year 1722 AD.

The name of Lawa & Ladana are often taken together when discussions over Lawa Thikana comes.

Ladana Fort 
There is a grand fort present in Ladana, built by Naruka chiefs.

Death of Sanga 
Earlier, Sanga got Karam Chand Naruka Dasawat murdered by the aid of Lala Sankhla. Meelu Charan of Bikaner, a loyal friend of Karam Chand, stabbed Sanga to death at Ladana.

Notable people 

 Bharat Singh Naruka - Fought against Amir Khan Pindari at Madhorajpura Fort

References 

Jaipur district